Nemophora sparsella is a moth of the  family Adelidae. It is found from southern Queensland to Victoria and Tasmania.

Larvae have been found in portable cases within the seed capsules of Bursaria spinosa. They probably feed on the flowers and developing seeds of this plant.

External links
Australian Faunal Directory
Moths of Australia

Moths of Australia
Adelidae
Moths described in 1863